Sericodes is a genus of flowering plants belonging to the family Zygophyllaceae.

Its native range is Northeastern Mexico.

Species
Species:
 Sericodes greggii A.Gray

References

Zygophyllaceae
Rosid genera